Circle the Dead is the debut full-length studio album by Australian metalcore band Buried in Verona. The album was released on 5 November 2008 through Riot Entertainment.

Track listing

Personnel
Buried in Verona
Brett Anderson – Lead vocals
Mick Taylor – guitar
Katongo Chituta – guitar
Scott Richmond – Bass guitar
Steve Rogers – Drums

Production
Greg Stace - Producer, engineer
Steve Smart - Mastering
DW Norton - Mixing
Gareth Leach - Mixing Assistant

References

2008 debut albums
Buried in Verona albums